The Málaga Philharmonic Orchestra is a Spanish orchestra based in Málaga.  Founded in 1991, the Philharmonic plays regularly at the Cervantes Theatre in Málaga. Since 2014, its principal conductor is Manuel Hernández-Silva.

History
The Málaga Philharmonic Orchestra gave its inaugural concert on 14 February 1991. It was born under the name of the-  City Orchestra of Málaga, an association between the Málaga Town Council and the Regional Government of Andalusia, and responded to the conviction that a city such as Málaga ought to have a great symphony orchestra of its own.
Throughout the years it has maintained the commitment to offer the city quality music along with the best conductors and soloists on the national and international scene. In charge of the Orchestra, and of the project encompassing it, five principal conductors have left their personal mark: Octav Calleya, Odón Alonso, Alexander Rahbari, Aldo Ceccato and Edmon Colomer. The list of guest conductors contains some great names: Jesús López Cobos, Philippe Entremont, Juanjo Mena, Sergiu Comissiona, Rafael Frühbeck de Burgos, Antoni Ros Marbá, Nicholas Milton, Yoav Talmi, to name but a few. Equally, the orchestra has been privileged to receive soloists of great prestige: Alicia de Larrocha, Plácido Domingo, Alfredo Kraus, Joaquín Achúcarro, Pinchas Zukerman, Montserrat Caballé, Ainhoa Arteta, Carlos Álvarez, Stefan Dohr, Hansjörg Schellenberger, Leónidas Kavakos, Nikolaj Znaider, Julian Rachlin, Asier Polo...

However, the Orchestra – renamed the Málaga Philharmonic Orchestra after celebrating its 10th anniversary – believes it is essential not to restrict its musical activity to the seasonal programmes and has put forward some exciting parallel proposals. Apart from CD recordings made of a wide selection of repertories, and under the baton of different maestros, special mention should be made of the Festival of Ancient Music as well as the Cycle of Contemporary Music, specially dedicated to Spanish music of our time, which has been steadily growing from year to year.
The orchestra is dedicated to the task of forming the audiences of the future, and with this in mind it has set up a programme of didactic activities, in collaboration with the Education Area of the Málaga Town Council.
The Málaga Philharmonic Orchestra has also achieved great successes in the most famous theatres and festivals around the country, as well as on a number of tours around Europe which have taken it to Sweden, Greece, Slovakia, Czech Republic and Germany.

Principal conductors

 Octav Calleya (1991–1995)
 Odón Alonso (1995–1999)
 Alexander Rahbari (1999–2004)
 Aldo Ceccato (2004–2009)
 Edmon Colomer (2010–2013)
 Manuel Hernández-Silva (2014– )

References

External links
 OFM Official website
 Teatro Cervantes Official website

Spanish orchestras
Musical groups established in 1991
1991 establishments in Spain